Mordellistena trimaculata is a species of beetle in the genus Mordellistena of the family Mordellidae. It was described by Mulsant in 1863.

References

External links
Coleoptera. BugGuide.

Beetles described in 1863
trimaculata
Taxa named by Étienne Mulsant